Maliwad Kalubhai Hirabhai is an Indian politician from Gujarat. He is a member of the BJP. He is the former member of legislative assembly (MLA), seat 122- lunawada Vidhansabha

In 2002, he was elected from Mahisagar district's Lunawada assembly constituency of Gujarat.

References

Living people
Bharatiya Janata Party politicians from Gujarat
Gujarat MLAs 2002–2007
People from Lunawada
People from Mahisagar district
Year of birth missing (living people)